Wellingsbüttel, a quarter in the Wandsbek borough in the city of  Hamburg in northern Germany, is a former independent settlement. In 2020 the population was 10,935.

History

The first records on Wellingsbüttel are from 1296. Wellingsbüttel became a part of Hamburg in 1937/1938 through the Greater Hamburg Act.

Geography
It is located in the Alster river valley (Alstertal) in northern Hamburg. To the north are the quarters Poppenbüttel and Sasel (north-east), to the east is Bramfeld, and to the south is the Ohlsdorf quarter of the Hamburg-Nord district.

Demographics
In 2007, the Wellingsbüttel quarter had a population of 9,874 people. The population density was 2,419 people per km2. 15.7% were children under the age of 18, and 27.5% were 65 years of age or older. 6.3% were immigrants. 130 people were registered as unemployed and 2,360 were employees subject to social insurance contributions.

In 1999, there were 4,724 households, out of which 17.9% had children under the age of 18 living with them and 38.7% of all households were made up of individuals. The average household size was 2.06.

In 2007, there were 577 criminal offences (59 crimes per 1000 people).

Education
There were 2 elementary schools in 2007.

Culture

Museums

The private Alstertal Museum is located in the gatehouse of Wellingsbüttel Manor since 1957.

Infrastructure

Health systems
In 2007 Wellingsbüttel had 5 day-care centers for children and also 21 physicians in private practice and 2 pharmacies.

Transportation
Public transport in Wellingsbüttel is provided by the rapid transit system of the city train with the Wellingsbüttel station and several bus lines. This is coordinated through the Hamburger Verkehrsverbund.

According to the Department of Motor Vehicles (Kraftfahrt-Bundesamt), in the quarter were 4,788 private cars registered (486 cars/1000 people) in 2007. There were 47 traffic accidents total, including 36 traffic accidents with damage to persons.

Notes

References
 Statistical office Hamburg and Schleswig-Holstein Statistisches Amt für Hamburg und Schleswig-Holstein, official website

External links

Quarters of Hamburg
Wandsbek